Eupithecia coetulata is a moth in the  family Geometridae. It is found in Peru.

The wingspan is 24 mm for males and 28 mm for females. The forewings rather glossy white, with mostly weak fuscous irroration. The markings are fuscous mixed with black. The hindwings are white, with about  seven lines of more or less confluent spots.

References

Moths described in 1916
coetulata
Moths of South America